is a Japanese judoka. He won a gold medal at the -60 kg category of the 2006 Asian Games.

He is from Yukuhashi, Fukuoka. After graduation from Tenri University, He belongs to Tokyo Metropolitan Police Department.

References

Japanese male judoka
People from Yukuhashi, Fukuoka
Sportspeople from Fukuoka Prefecture
1976 births
Living people
Asian Games medalists in judo
Judoka at the 2006 Asian Games
Asian Games gold medalists for Japan
Medalists at the 2006 Asian Games
20th-century Japanese people
21st-century Japanese people